Doina is a moth genus of the family Depressariidae.

Species
 Doina annulata Clarke, 1978
 Doina asperula Clarke, 1978
 Doina clarkei Parra & Ibarra-Vidal, 1991
 Doina edmondsii (Butler, 1883)
 Doina eremnogramma Clarke, 1978
 Doina flinti Clarke, 1978
 Doina glebula Clarke, 1978
 Doina inconspicua Clarke, 1978
 Doina increta (Butler, 1883)
 Doina lagneia Clarke, 1978
 Doina paralagneia Clarke, 1978
 Doina phaeobregma Clarke, 1978
 Doina scariphista (Meyrick, 1931)
 Doina subicula Clarke, 1978
 Doina trachycantha Clarke, 1978
 Doina truncata Clarke, 1978

References

 
Depressariinae